Jonathan Clark may refer to:

Jonathan Clark (cricketer) (born 1981), South African cricketer
Jonathan Clark (soldier) (1750–1811), U.S. general, older brother of George Rogers Clark and William Clark
Jonathan Clark (footballer) (born 1958), Welsh footballer
J. C. D. Clark (born 1951), British historian
Jonathan Clark of the Clark baronets
Jonathan Clark (bishop) (born 1961), Church of England bishop
Jonathan Clark (TV personality)

See also 
Jon Clark (disambiguation)
John Clark (disambiguation)